Noriyuki "Pat" Morita  (June 28, 1932 – November 24, 2005) was an American actor and comedian. He was known for his roles as Matsuo "Arnold" Takahashi on Happy Days, Mr. Miyagi in The Karate Kid film series, Captain Sam Pak on the sitcom M*A*S*H, Ah Chew in Sanford and Son, Mike Woo in The Mystery Files of Shelby Woo, and The Emperor of China in Mulan and Mulan II. He was the series lead actor in the television program Mr. T and Tina and in Ohara, a police-themed drama. The two shows made history for being among the few TV shows with an Asian-American series lead.

Morita was nominated for the 1985 Academy Award for Best Supporting Actor for his portrayal of Mr. Miyagi in The Karate Kid, which would be the first of a media franchise in which Morita was the central player.

Early life
Morita was born on June 28, 1932, in Isleton, California to Japanese immigrant parents. Morita's father Tamaru, born in 1897, immigrated to California from Kumamoto Prefecture on the Japanese island of Kyushu in 1915. Tamaru's wife, Momoe, born in 1903, immigrated to California in 1913. Noriyuki, as Pat was named, had a brother named Hideo (Harry) who was twelve years older.

Morita developed spinal tuberculosis (Pott disease) at the age of two and spent the bulk of the next nine years in the Weimar Institute in Weimar, California, and later at the Shriners Hospital in San Francisco. For long periods, he was wrapped in a full-body cast, and he was told that he would never walk. During his time at a sanatorium near Sacramento, Morita befriended a visiting priest who would often joke that, if Morita ever converted to Catholicism, the priest would rename him to "Patrick Aloysius Ignatius Xavier Noriyuki Morita". Released from the hospital at age 11 after undergoing extensive spinal surgery and learning how to walk, Morita was transported from the hospital directly to the Gila River camp in Arizona to join his interned family. After about a year and a half, he was transferred to the Tule Lake War Relocation Center.

After World War II ended, Morita moved back to the Bay Area and he graduated from Armijo High School in Fairfield, California, in 1949. For a time after the war, the family operated Ariake Chop Suey, a restaurant in Sacramento, California, jokingly described by Morita years later as "a Japanese family running a Chinese restaurant in a black neighborhood with a clientele of blacks, Filipinos and everybody else who didn't fit in any of the other neighborhoods". Morita would entertain customers with jokes and serve as master of ceremonies for group dinners. After Morita's father was killed in 1956 in a hit-and-run while walking home from an all-night movie, Morita and his mother kept the restaurant going for another three or four years. Needing a regular job to support his wife and a newly born child, Morita became a data processor in the early 1960s with the Department of Motor Vehicles and other state agencies, graduating to a graveyard shift job at Aerojet General. In due time, he was a department head at another aerospace firm, Lockheed, handling the liaison between the engineers and the programmers who were mapping out lunar eclipses for Polaris and Titan missile projects.

However, Morita suffered from occupational burnout and decided to quit his job and try show business. He began working as a stand-up comedian at small clubs in Sacramento and San Francisco, and took the stage name "Pat Morita", in part due to the presence of comedians including Pat Henry and Pat Cooper, and in part due to memories of the priest he had befriended as a boy. Morita struggled for many years in comedy, until fellow performer—ventriloquist Hank Garcia—told him to try his luck in Los Angeles. Sally Marr, Lenny Bruce's mother, acted as his agent and manager after he moved to Los Angeles, and booked him in the San Fernando Valley and at the Horn nightclub in Santa Monica. Morita sometimes worked as the opening act for singers Vic Damone and Connie Stevens and for his mentor, the comedian Redd Foxx. Morita used the nickname "The Hip Nip".

Television and movie career

Early work
Morita's first movie roles were as a henchman in Thoroughly Modern Millie (1967) and a similar role in The Shakiest Gun in the West (1968), starring Don Knotts. Morita had other notable recurring television roles on Sanford and Son (1974–1976) as Ah Chew, a good-natured friend of Lamont Sanford, and as South Korean Army Captain Sam Pak on the sitcom M*A*S*H (1973, 1974). He was also cast as Rear Admiral Ryunosuke Kusaka in the war film Midway (1976).

Happy Days
Morita had a recurring role in the mid-1970's on Happy Days as Matsuo "Arnold" Takahashi (the new Japanese owner of Arnold's Drive-In) commencing in season three (1975–76). The story line was that Takahashi had purchased the Milwaukee eatery from the original Arnold but adopted the former’s first name, explaining that it was too expensive for him to purchase the additional neon sign letters required to rename it "Takahashi's". As the new owner, he moonlighted as a martial arts instructor, teaching self-defense classes at the drive-in after hours. Morita also portrayed "Arnold" as a guest star during seasons four and six before returning as a recurring character for season ten and as a main character in the final eleventh season. He also portrayed the character of Arnold on Blansky's Beauties in 1977.

The Karate Kid film series
Morita gained particular fame during the 1980's for his work as Mr. Miyagi in the Karate Kid films. The original preferred choice was Toshiro Mifune, who had appeared in the Akira Kurosawa films Rashomon (1950), Seven Samurai (1954), and The Hidden Fortress (1958), but the actor did not speak English. Morita later auditioned for the role, but was initially rejected for the part due to his close association with stand-up comedy, and with the character Arnold from Happy Days. Producer Jerry Weintraub in particular did not want Morita, as he saw him as a comedic actor. Morita eventually tested five times before Weintraub himself offered him the role, ultimately winning it because he grew a beard and patterned his accent after his uncle. After he was cast and although he had been using the name Pat for years, Weintraub suggested that he be billed with his given name to sound "more ethnic". 

In the first film, in The Karate Kid (1984), he was nominated for an Academy Award for Best Supporting Actor and a corresponding Golden Globe Award, for his role as the wise karate teacher Mr. Miyagi who taught bullied teenager Daniel LaRusso (Ralph Macchio) the art of Goju-ryu karate . He was recognized as Noriyuki "Pat" Morita at the 57th Academy Awards ceremony. He reprised the role two more times with Macchio in The Karate Kid Part II (1986) andThe Karate Kid Part III (1989). In 1994, he starred in The Next Karate Kid with Hilary Swank (as bullied teenager Julie Pierce) instead of Macchio.

Television series
Morita was the star of two television series. In 1976, he starred as inventor Taro Takahashi in his own show, Mr. T and Tina, the first Asian-American sitcom on network TV. The sitcom was placed on Saturday nights by ABC and was quickly canceled after a month in the fall of 1976. He also starred in the ABC detective show Ohara (1987–1988); it was cancelled after two seasons due to poor ratings.

Later work

Morita went on to play Tommy Tanaka in the Kirk Douglas-starring television movie Amos, receiving his first Primetime Emmy Award nomination and second Golden Globe Award nomination for the role.

He wrote and starred in the World War II romance film Captive Hearts (1987). He hosted the educational home video series Britannica's Tales Around the World (1990–1991). He made an appearance on The Fresh Prince of Belair in the 1994 Season 5 episode “Love Hurts”. Later in his career he starred on the Nickelodeon television series The Mystery Files of Shelby Woo (1996–1998), and had a recurring role on the sitcom The Hughleys (2000). He also made a guest appearance on a 1996 episode of Married... with Children. He went on to star in the short film Talk To Taka as a sushi chef who doles out advice to anyone who will hear him. He voiced the Emperor of China in Disney's 36th animated feature Mulan (1998) and reprised the role in Mulan II (2004), a direct-to-video sequel and Kingdom Hearts II.

He spoofed his role as "Mr. Miyagi" in a series of commercials for Colgate toothpaste; he portrayed the white-clad Wisdom Tooth, hailing Colgate as "The Wise Choice".

He had a cameo appearance in the 2001 Alien Ant Farm music video "Movies". His appearance in the video spoofed his role in The Karate Kid. In 2002, he made a guest appearance on an episode of Spy TV. In 2003, he had a cameo on an episode of Yes, Dear, as an unnamed karate teacher, potentially being Miyagi. He would also reprise his role (to an extent) in the stop-motion animated series Robot Chicken in 2005.

Death
Morita died of kidney failure, following a urinary tract and gallbladder infection, on November 24, 2005, at his home in Las Vegas, Nevada, at the age of 73. Throughout his life, Morita had battled alcoholism.
He was cremated at Palm Green Valley Mortuary and Cemetery in Las Vegas, Nevada.

Posthumous credits
Roles created prior to his passing were included in a few posthumous works. He voiced Master Udon in the 2006 SpongeBob SquarePants Season 4 episode "Karate Island" (the episode was dedicated to his memory). He had a role in the independent feature film Only the Brave (2006), about the 442nd Regimental Combat Team, where he plays the father of lead actor (and director) Lane Nishikawa (the film included two other Karate Kid stars, Yuji Okumoto and Tamlyn Tomita). He also had roles in Act Your Age (2011), Royal Kill (2009), and Remove All Obstacles (2010).

The fifth episode of the 2018–present series Cobra Kai (a web-streaming follow up to the original Karate Kid films) was dedicated to his memory. Mr. Miyagi is frequently referenced via archival footage from the original films during Cobra Kai, having died on November 15, 2011 (6 years after Morita's death).

Morita’s contributions to cinema and his legacy have been the subject of two documentaries including  Pat Morita: Long Story Short and More Than Miyagi: The Pat Morita Story in which he appeared in archival footage.

Filmography

Posthumous credits

See also

References

External links

 
 
George Takei and Pat Morita’s Harrowing Childhood Experiences in Japanese American Internment Camps - Biography Channel, May 4, 2021.
Ralph Macchio on His Friend and 'Karate Kid' Costar Pat Morita: His Legacy 'Shines Brighter Than Ever' - People, November 6, 2022

1932 births
2005 deaths
American male actors of Japanese descent
American male comedians
American comedians of Asian descent
American male film actors
American male television actors
American male video game actors
American male voice actors
American film actors of Asian descent
Comedians from California
Deaths from kidney failure
Japanese-American internees
Male actors from California
People from Fairfield, California
People from Sacramento County, California
People from the Las Vegas Valley
20th-century American comedians
21st-century American comedians
20th-century American male actors
21st-century American male actors